Samuel Loizou (born 25 December 2002) is an Australian professional rugby league footballer who plays as a er for the Parramatta Eels in the NRL.

Playing career
Loizou is of Greek Cypriot heritage.

In 2019, Loizou represented the Australian Schoolboys being the youngest player in the squad. Loizou was also a part of Parramatta's SG Ball team at 16 years of age winning their best and fairest award in 2019.

In 2021, Loizou started training with Parramatta's first grade squad, playing for their Jersey Flegg team and appearing in two games for NSW Cup. In round 25 2021, Loizou made his NRL debut for Parramatta off the bench against the Penrith Panthers at Cbus Super Stadium in a 6–40 loss.

References

External links
Parramatta Eels profile
Loizou selected for Australian Schoolboys
Round 25 team list

2002 births
Living people
Australian people of Greek Cypriot descent
Australian rugby league players
Parramatta Eels players
Rugby league centres
Rugby league players from Sydney
Rugby league wingers